Steffen Jensen (born 5 December 1989 in Odder) is a Danish rower.

External links 
 

1989 births
Living people
Danish male rowers
People from Odder Municipality
World Rowing Championships medalists for Denmark
Sportspeople from the Central Denmark Region